Jody Paul (born 25 May 1976) is a South African former field hockey player who competed in the 2004 Summer Olympics.

On 25 January 2022 Paul was appointed as the Assistant Coach to the England and Great Britain senior women's squads.

References

External links

1976 births
Living people
South African male field hockey players
Olympic field hockey players of South Africa
Field hockey players at the 2004 Summer Olympics
Field hockey players at the 2006 Commonwealth Games
Commonwealth Games competitors for South Africa
Team Bath Buccaneers Hockey Club players